Jordy José Delem (born 18 March 1993) is a Martiniquais professional footballer who plays as a midfielder for San Antonio FC. Besides Martinique, he has played in France and the United States.

Club career

Professional
Delem started his senior career with Club Franciscain, whom he captained in 2014. In 2015, he joined French team AC Arles-Avignon.  On 29 April 2016, he signed with USL club Seattle Sounders FC 2.  He made his debut for the club two days later in a 1–1 draw against Oklahoma City Energy.

After making 19 appearances for Sounders 2, Delem signed a first team contract with Seattle Sounders FC on 2 March 2017.  Delem made his Sounders debut on 31 March 2017, starting at right back in a 0–0 draw against Atlanta United FC.

Following the 2021 season, Seattle declined their contract option on Delem.

On 19 May 2022, Delem signed with San Antonio FC for the 2022 season.

International career
Delem represented the Martinique national team at the 2013, 2017 and 2019 CONCACAF Gold Cup.

Career statistics

Club

International

International goals
Scores and results list Martinique's goal tally first.

Honours

Club
Seattle Sounders FC
MLS Cup: 2019

References

External links

1993 births
Living people
People from Le François
Martiniquais footballers
Association football midfielders
Championnat National 2 players
Championnat National 3 players
AC Arlésien players
USL Championship players
Major League Soccer players
Tacoma Defiance players
Seattle Sounders FC players
San Antonio FC players
Martiniquais expatriate footballers
Expatriate soccer players in the United States
Martiniquais expatriate sportspeople in the United States
Martinique international footballers
2013 CONCACAF Gold Cup players
2017 CONCACAF Gold Cup players
2019 CONCACAF Gold Cup players